Los Olivos is a corregimiento in Los Santos District, Los Santos Province, Panama with a population of 1,259 as of 2010. Its population as of 1990 was 988; its population as of 2000 was 1,149.

References

Corregimientos of Los Santos Province